Ensina brevior is a species of tephritid or fruit flies in the genus Ensina of the family Tephritidae.

Distribution
Peru.

References

Tephritinae
Insects described in 1940
Diptera of South America